Hugo Parga (born November 17, 1961 in San Carlos, Maldonado Department) is a Uruguayan current manager of Deportivo Maldonado.

External links
 

1961 births
Living people
People from San Carlos, Uruguay
Uruguayan football managers
Tacuarembó F.C. managers
Rampla Juniors managers
Deportivo Maldonado managers
C.A. Cerro managers